Thomas D. Carr is a vertebrate paleontologist who received his Ph.D. from the University of Toronto in 2005. He is now a member of the biology faculty at Carthage College in Kenosha, Wisconsin. Much of his work centers on tyrannosauroid dinosaurs. Carr published the first quantitative analysis of tyrannosaurid ontogeny in 1999, establishing that several previously recognized genera and species of tyrannosaurids were in fact juveniles of other recognized taxa. Carr shared the Lanzendorf Prize for scientific illustration at the 2000 Society of Vertebrate Paleontology conference for the artwork in this article. In 2005, he and two colleagues described and named Appalachiosaurus, a late-surviving basal tyrannosauroid found in Alabama. He is also scientific advisor to the Dinosaur Discovery Museum in Kenosha, Wisconsin.

Selected publications 
Carr, Thomas D. (1999). "Craniofacial ontogeny in Tyrannosauridae (Dinosauria, Coelurosauria)." Journal of Vertebrate Paleontology 19 (3): 497–520.
Carr, Thomas D.; Williamson, Thomas E.; & Schwimmer, David R. (2005). "A new genus and species of tyrannosauroid from the Late Cretaceous (middle Campanian) Demopolis Formation of Alabama." Journal of Vertebrate Paleontology 25 (1): 119–143.

References

External links 
 https://www.carthage.edu/live/news/28551-carthage-paleo-track-professor-and-students
 https://www.esconi.org/esconi_earth_science_club/2011/04/thomas-carr-decoding-dinosaurs-at-carthage.html
 https://www.sciencedaily.com/releases/2015/10/151029102249.htm
 https://www.science.org/content/article/baby-tyrannosaur-s-ebay-auction-sparks-outrage

Carthage College faculty
Living people
University of Toronto alumni
American paleontologists
20th-century American scientists
21st-century American scientists
Year of birth missing (living people)